Maximilian van der Sandt, S.J. (17 April 1578 – 21 June 1656), known as Sandaus or Sandaeus, was a noted Dutch Jesuit theologian.

Van der Sandt was born in Amsterdam, then part of the Spanish Netherlands.  He entered the novitiate of the Society of Jesus, 21 November 1597; he taught philosophy at Würzburg and Sacred Scripture at Mainz. He became rector of the episcopal seminary at Würzburg.

He wrote many works on philosophy and theology, among others a notable controversial reply to the Batavian Calvinist Lawrence in defence of the moral teaching of the Jesuits, entitled Castigatio conscientiae Jesuiticae cauteriata. . .a Jacobo Laurentio, Würzburg, 1617. It was said of him that he left a book for every one of the seventy-eight years of his life, several devotional treatises on the Blessed Virgin, and many ascetical and mystical treatises.  He died at Cologne, then a free city in the Holy Roman Empire.

References
 Sommervogel, Carlos, Bibliotheque de la Compagnie de Jesus, XII (Paris, 1896)
 Poulain, Des Graces d'orasion (6th ed., Paris); The Graces of Interior Prayer, tr. Smith (London, 1911)
 This article incorporates text from the 1913 Catholic Encyclopedia article "Maximilian Van der Sandt" by Gertrude Dana Steele, a publication now in the public domain.

External links

1578 births
1656 deaths
Jesuits of the Spanish Netherlands
Writers from Amsterdam
Jesuit theologians